The tournaments of Rugby sevens at the 2023 Pan American Games are scheduled to be held in Santiago, Chile in 2023. 

A total of eight men's and eight women's teams (each consisting up to 12 athletes) will compete in each tournament. This means a total of 192 athletes are scheduled to compete.

Qualification
Eight men's teams and eight women's teams will qualify to compete at the games in each tournament. The host nation (Chile) received automatic qualification in both tournaments, along with seven other teams.

Men

Women

Participating nations
The following countries qualified rugby sevens teams. The numbers of participants qualified are in parentheses.

Medal summary

Medalists

References

 
Rugby sevens
Rugby sevens
Rugby union in Chile
2023 rugby sevens competitions